Brasenose Wood and Shotover Hill is a  biological Site of Special Scientific Interest on the eastern outskirts of Oxford in Oxfordshire. It is a Nature Conservation Review site.

Most Brasenose Wood is a remnant of the ancient Shotover Forest, and it is one of the few woods which is still managed by the traditional method of coppice-with-standards. It has a very diverse ground flora, and 221 species of vascular plant have been recorded, including 46 which are characteristic of ancient woodland. Shotover Hill has heath and unimproved grassland. It is described by Natural England as "of outstanding entomological interest", with many rare flies, bees, wasps and ants.

The site is run by Oxford City Council as a country park and is open to the public.

See also
Shotover Park

References

 
Sites of Special Scientific Interest in Oxfordshire
Nature Conservation Review sites